The following is a list of La Salle Explorers men's basketball head coaches. There have been 20 head coaches of the Explorers in their 93-season history.

La Salle's current head coach is Fran Dunphy. He was hired as the Explorers' head coach in April 2022, replacing Ashley Howard, who was fired after the 2021–22 season.

References

La Salle

La Salle Explorers basketball, men's, coaches